Ara Nigoyan (born 27 October 1968) is a retired football defender and midfielder from Armenia. He obtained a total number of three caps for the national team. Nigoyan made his debut on 14 October 1992 against Moldova (0–0).

References
 

1968 births
Living people
Armenian footballers
Armenia international footballers
Association football defenders
Soviet footballers
FC Ararat Yerevan players